The Hilo Stars were a minor league baseball team in the Hawaii Winter Baseball league. They were based in Hilo, Hawaii. They played their home games at Vulcan Field and Wong Stadium.  Former players include Ichiro Suzuki, Bill Mueller, Adam Kenedy, Shane Spencer, Preston Wilson, R.A. Dickey, Tsuyoshi Shinjo

Team record

External links
 Hawaii Winter Baseball website

Defunct Hawaii Winter Baseball teams
1993 establishments in Hawaii
1997 disestablishments in Hawaii
Baseball teams established in 1993
Baseball teams disestablished in 1997
Hilo, Hawaii
Defunct baseball teams in Hawaii